A meat market is, traditionally, a marketplace where meat is sold, often by a butcher. It is a specialized wet market. The term is sometimes used to refer to a meat retail store or butcher's shop, in particular in North America. During the mid and late 19th century scientific research into epidemiology, sanitation and urban planning in Western countries led to the establishment of meat markets so that the slaughtering and sale of meat could be easily monitored and the risk of disease outbreaks could be minimized.

Overview of meat trade

A butcher specializes in the preparation and sale of meat. Butchers sometimes operate specialized shops selling meat, known as butcher's shops, meat stores, meat markets or butcheries. Meat may also be sold in supermarkets, grocery stores, and fish markets, and these shops may employ a butcher.

A slaughterhouse or abattoir is a facility that specializes in killing animals for meat. A meat cutter prepares primal cuts of meat into smaller portions for retail sale.

Examples
World Wide:

• Butchery Market 
London wholesale meat markets:
 Leadenhall Market
 Smithfield Market (began as a livestock market, but became a meat, poultry and fish market)
Melbourne:
 Metropolitan Meat Market
 Queen Victoria Market
 Plaza Juan Ponce de León meat market, Puerto Rico
The Shambles (Medieval meat markets in York, Stroud and Shepton Mallet)

References

Food markets